Marie-Madeleine Prongué (31 July 1939 – 23 May 2019) was a Swiss politician who was a member of the Council of States in 1995.

Life 

Prongué's political career began as a member of the city council of Porrentruy from 1981 – 1988. She sat in the Parliament of Jura from 1983 until 1994. In 1995 she was the first woman to represent Jura in the Council of States (January – December).

Prongué was a member of the Christian Democratic People's Party of Switzerland, and became the first woman to lead the party in the canton of Jura in 1982. She co-chaired a commission representing women in the Catholic Church in Switzerland, until she resigned in protest alongside most other members of the commission in 2006.

Prongué died in Porrentruy in 2019.

References

External links 
 
 
 

1939 births
2019 deaths
Christian Democratic People's Party of Switzerland politicians
Members of the Council of States (Switzerland)
Women members of the Council of States (Switzerland)
20th-century Swiss politicians
20th-century Swiss women politicians